Fernando Antoneyo Bryant (born March 26, 1977) is a former American football cornerback of the National Football League (NFL). He was drafted by the Jacksonville Jaguars 26th overall in the 1999 NFL Draft. He played college football at Alabama.

Bryant was also a member of the Detroit Lions, New England Patriots, and Pittsburgh Steelers. He beat the Arizona Cardinals in Super Bowl XLIII as a member of the Steelers.

Early years
Bryant attended Riverdale High School in Murfreesboro, Tennessee, and starred in football as a wide receiver/defensive back and in track as a sprinter. In football, as a senior, he garnered All-American honors, and finished the year with six interceptions and 82 tackles on defense, and 48 receptions on offense.

College career
At the University of Alabama, Bryant was an All-SEC second-team selection in 1996 and 1997, as well as an All-SEC first-team selection in 1998 and nicknamed TWO-FIVE.

Professional career

Jacksonville Jaguars
Bryant was drafted in the first round (26th overall) in the 1999 NFL Draft by the Jacksonville Jaguars. He spent five years with the Jaguars.

Detroit Lions
Bryant was signed as a free agent by the Detroit Lions in 2004. On February 25, 2008, the Lions released Bryant

New England Patriots
On March 20, 2008, he signed a one-year deal with the New England Patriots, he was cut by the team on August 30, 2008.

Pittsburgh Steelers
On November 11, 2008, Bryant was signed by the Pittsburgh Steelers where he was reunited with college teammate Deshea Townsend.

On June 23, 2009, his agent Drew Rosenhaus announced that Bryant had decided to retire.

NFL statistics

References

External links
Detroit Lions bio
New England Patriots bio
Pittsburgh Steelers bio

1977 births
Living people
Sportspeople from Albany, Georgia
American football cornerbacks
Alabama Crimson Tide football players
Jacksonville Jaguars players
Detroit Lions players
New England Patriots players
Pittsburgh Steelers players
Players of American football from Georgia (U.S. state)